Kwemoi is a surname of East African origin given by the Kalenjin people that may refer to:

Robert Kwemoi Chemosin (born 1989), Kenyan half marathon runner
Ronald Kwemoi (born 1995), Kenyan long-distance runner

See also
Kipkemoi, a similar Kenyan name
Kemboi, a similar Kenyan name

Kenyan names